Chattogram Kotwali is a thana of Chattogram District in Chattogram Division, Bangladesh.

Geography
It has 43062 households and total area 6.24 km2.

Demographics
At the 1991 Bangladesh census, Chittagong Kotwali had a population of 246,893, of whom 159,706 were aged 18 or older. Males constituted 62.62% of the population, and females 37.38%. Chittagong Kotwali had an average literacy rate of 71.5% (7+ years), against the national average of 32.4%.

Education

 Government Muslim High School
 Saint Placid's High School
 Government City College, Chittagong
 Chittagong Collegiate School and College
 Kazim Ali High School
 Dr. Khastagir Government Girls' High School
 Chittagong Municipal Model High School
 Aparnacharan City Corporation Girls' High School
 Chittagong Ideal School & College

According to Banglapedia, Kazim Ali High School, founded in 1885, is a notable secondary school.

Gallery

See also
Upazilas of Bangladesh
Districts of Bangladesh
Divisions of Bangladesh

References

Thanas of Chittagong District